Jack Charles Evans (born January 10, 1948) is a former American football running back in the National Football League (NFL). He played professionally for the New York Giants and Washington Redskins.

Biography
Evans was born in Gardena, California and graduated from Gardena High School. He played college football at the University of Utah and the University of Southern California.

He was drafted by the New York Giants in the 14th round (356th overall) of the 1971 NFL Draft, and played four seasons in the NFL.

References

External links
 

1948 births
Living people
People from Gardena, California
Players of American football from California
Sportspeople from Los Angeles County, California
American football running backs
Utah Utes football players
USC Trojans football players
New York Giants players
Washington Redskins players